Marion Kalmus is a British Artist who produced work between 1993 and 2002. After a first profession as a fresco restorer, Kalmus studied Fine Art at Goldsmiths, University of London. Whilst still a student she was commissioned to make a work at the Royal Festival Hall, London  She won the Nicholas and Andre Tooth Scholarship and used the prize to film her work  Deserter which was shown at the Tate Liverpool 1995.

She was the Kettle's Yard Fellow 1997-8 and a Fellow of Pembroke College, Cambridge.  Kalmus returned to Cambridge in 2000 to stage her surround sound film Restoration Drama at the former Festival Theatre, Cambridge.

Her permanent architectural intervention for Norman Foster’s National Botanic Garden of Wales opened in December 2001.  In 2002 her work was shown at the Victoria and Albert Museum, London. She was nominated for the Jerwood Artist’s Platform 2004.

Kalmus was an early adopter of digital technologies, making computer-controlled artworks in the early 1990s when such technologies in fine art were still very unusual. She produced, "Formal work of striking visual clarity" via "Painterly and cinematic narratives which belie the extraordinary technical expertise employed in their construction". Her reputation as an artist whose work, "deftly traverses both digital and traditional media," was cemented when she was nominated for both Digital Art and Fine Art Sculpture prizes within a year:  The Imaginaria Digital Art prize at the Institute of Contemporary Arts 1999 and the Jerwood Sculpture Prize for 2001.

She taught at Central Saint Martins and was a visiting lecturer at the Royal College of Art, the Slade School of Fine Art, University College London and the University of Nottingham. She was an active public speaker, speaking at the Architectural Association and Royal Institution and frequently appeared on TV and Radio. She was also active in advocacy and advice on arts policies and the provision of media facilities in art institutions and galleries.

Sources

References

Living people
British conceptual artists
Women conceptual artists
Alumni of Goldsmiths, University of London
Academics of the Slade School of Fine Art
English mixed media artists
English installation artists
English women artists
21st-century British women artists
Year of birth missing (living people)
20th-century English women
20th-century English people
21st-century English women
21st-century English people